South Ribble Borough Council elections are held every four years. South Ribble Borough Council is the local authority for the non-metropolitan district of South Ribble in Lancashire, England. Since the last boundary changes in 2015, 50 councillors have been elected from 23 wards. The next borough council elections are due to take place in May of 2023 as part of the wider 2023 United Kingdom local elections.

Political control
The first election to the council was held in 1973, initially operating as a shadow authority before coming into its powers on 1 April 1974. Since 1973 political control of the council has been held by the following parties:

Leadership
The leaders of the council since 2007 have been:

Council elections
1973 South Ribble Borough Council election
1976 South Ribble Borough Council election (New ward boundaries)
1979 South Ribble Borough Council election
1983 South Ribble Borough Council election
1987 South Ribble Borough Council election (New ward boundaries & borough boundary changes also took place)
1991 South Ribble Borough Council election
1995 South Ribble Borough Council election
1999 South Ribble Borough Council election
2003 South Ribble Borough Council election (New ward boundaries increased the number of seats by 1)
2007 South Ribble Borough Council election
2011 South Ribble Borough Council election
2015 South Ribble Borough Council election (New ward boundaries)
2019 South Ribble Borough Council election
2023 South Ribble Borough Council election

Election results

Council composition

Borough result maps

By-election results

1995-1999

1999-2003

2003-2007

2007-2011

2011-2015

2015-2019

2019-2023

Notes

References

By-election results

External links
South Ribble Borough Council

 
District council elections in England
South Ribble
Council elections